Mankowski is a surname. Notable people with the surname include:

Bruno Mankowski (1902–1990), German-born American sculptor, carver, ceramicist, and medalist
Guy Mankowski (born 1983), British writer
Phil Mankowski (born 1953), American baseball player
Pierre Mankowski (born 1951), French footballer and coach

See also
Małkowski (surname)